Codification of laws is a common practice in the Philippines. Many general areas of substantive law, such as criminal law, civil law and labor law are governed by legal codes.

Tradition of codification

Codification is predominant in countries that adhere to the legal system of civil law. Spain, a civil law country, introduced the practice of codification in the Philippines, which it had colonized beginning in the late 16th century. Among the codes that Spain enforced in the Philippines were the Spanish Civil Code and the Penal Code.

The practice of codification was retained during the period of American colonial period, even though the United States was a common law jurisdiction. However, during that same period, many common law principles found their way into the legal system by way of legislation and by judicial pronouncements. Judicial precedents of the Philippine Supreme Court were accepted as binding, a practice more attuned to common law jurisdictions. Eventually, the Philippine legal system emerged in such a way that while the practice of codification remained popular, the courts were not barred from invoking principles developed under the common law, or from employing methods of statutory construction in order to arrive at an interpretation of the codal provisions that would be binding in itself in Philippine law. 

Beginning in the American period, there was an effort to revise the Spanish codes that had remained in force even after the end of Spanish rule. A new Revised Penal Code was enacted in 1930, while a new Civil Code took effect in 1950.

Codes in relation to Republic Acts

Since the formation of local legislative bodies in the Philippines, Philippine legal codes have been enacted by the legislature, in the exercise of its powers of legislation. Since 1946, the laws passed by the Congress, including legal codes, have been titled Republic Acts.

While Philippine legal codes are, strictly speaking, also Republic Acts, they may be differentiated in that the former represents a more comprehensive effort in embodying all aspects of a general area of law into just one legislative act. In contrast, Republic Acts are generally less expansive and more specific in scope. Thus, while the Civil Code seeks to govern all aspects of private law in the Philippines, a Republic Act such as Republic Act No. 9048 would concern itself with a more limited field, as in that case, the correction of entries in the civil registry. 

Still, the amendment of Philippine legal codes is accomplished through the passage of Republic Acts. Republic Acts have also been utilized to enact legislation on areas where the legal codes have proven insufficient. For example, while the possession of narcotics had been penalized under the 1930s Revised Penal Code, the wider attention drawn to illegal drugs in the 1960s and the 1970s led to new legislation increasing the penalties for possession and trafficking of narcotics. Instead of enacting amendments to the Revised Penal Code, Congress chose instead to enact a special law, the Dangerous Drugs Act of 1972.

Philippine legal codes

See also
 List of Philippine legal terms

Notes

References

External links
 Laws and Issuances | Official Gazette of the Republic of the Philippines
 Republic Acts – House of Representatives of the Philippines
 ChanRobles Virtual Law Library
 ChanRobles Virtual Law Library (new site)
 The Corpus Juris Online Law Library
 The Lawphil Project by Arellano Law Foundation
 

Law of the Philippines
Legal codes